List of combinatorial computational geometry topics enumerates the topics of computational geometry that states problems in terms of geometric objects as discrete entities and hence the methods of their solution are mostly theories and algorithms of combinatorial character.

See List of numerical computational geometry topics for another flavor of computational geometry that deals with geometric objects as continuous entities and applies methods and algorithms of nature characteristic to numerical analysis.

Construction/representation
 Boolean operations on polygons
 Convex hull
 Hyperplane arrangement
 Polygon decomposition
 Polygon triangulation
 Minimal convex decomposition
 Minimal convex cover problem (NP-hard)
 Minimal rectangular decomposition
 Tessellation problems
 Shape dissection problems
 Straight skeleton
 Stabbing line problem
 Triangulation
 Delaunay triangulation
 Point-set triangulation
 Polygon triangulation
 Voronoi diagram

Extremal shapes
 Minimum bounding box (Smallest enclosing box, Smallest bounding box)
 2-D case: Smallest bounding rectangle (Smallest enclosing rectangle)
 There are two common variants of this problem.
 In many areas of computer graphics, the bounding box (often abbreviated to bbox) is understood to be the smallest box delimited by sides parallel to coordinate axes which encloses the objects in question.
 In other applications, such as packaging, the problem is to find the smallest box the object (or objects) may fit in ("packaged"). Here the box may assume an arbitrary orientation with respect to the "packaged" objects.
 Smallest bounding sphere (Smallest enclosing sphere)
 2-D case: Smallest bounding circle
 Largest empty rectangle (Maximum empty rectangle)
 Largest empty sphere
 2-D case: Maximum empty circle (largest empty circle)

Interaction/search
 Collision detection
 Line segment intersection
 Point location
 Point in polygon
 Polygon intersection
 Range searching 
 Orthogonal range searching
 Simplex range searching
 Ray casting (not to be confused with ray tracing of computer graphics)

Proximity problems
 Closest pair of points
 Closest point problem
 Diameter of a point set
 Delaunay triangulation
 Voronoi diagram

Visibility
 Visibility (geometry)
 Art gallery problem (The museum problem)
 Visibility graph
 Watchman route problem
 Computer graphics applications: 
 Hidden surface determination
 Hidden line removal
 Ray casting (not to be confused with ray tracing of computer graphics)

Other
 Happy ending problem
 Ham sandwich problem
 shape assembly problems
 shape matching problems
Klee's measure problem
Problems on isothetic polygons and isothetic polyhedra
Orthogonal convex hull
Path planning
 Paths among obstacles
Shortest path in a polygon
 Polygon containment
Robust geometric computation addresses two main issues: fixed-precision representation of real numbers in computers and possible geometrical degeneracy (mathematics) of input data

Computational geometry
Computational geometry
Computational geometry
Mathematics-related lists